Matthew Bernard Fox (Babe, Ben) (October 6, 1916 – October 3, 1998) was an American figure skater who competed in single skating and pair skating. His pairs partner was Joan Tozzer. They won the United States Figure Skating Championships  pairs title in 1938, 1939, and 1940. Fox was the 1936 U.S. Champion in both singles and pairs on the junior level. He received his bachelor's degree from Harvard University, class of 1938. After service in the U. S. Navy in World War II, he had a long career in television, first in programming at the Dumont Network in New York City and then in Los Angeles, where, under the name Ben Fox, he created and produced "Waterfront" (starring Preston Foster) and other series.

He was first husband of Lucy Pope, later wife of tennis coach Harry Hopman.

Results
pairs with Joan Tozzer

References

   

American male pair skaters
American male single skaters
Harvard University alumni
1916 births
1998 deaths
20th-century American people